Lawrence Edward McDonald (born 15 February 1966) is a South African politician who has been a Member of the National Assembly since May 2019. McDonald is a member of the African National Congress.

Parliamentary career
McDonald is a member of the African National Congress.  He was 8th on the party's regional Free State election list for the general election of 8 May 2019. Following the election, he was sworn in as a Member of the National Assembly on 22 May 2019. McDonald became a member of the Portfolio Committee on Transport on 27 June.

On 2 July 2019, he nominated Mosebenzi Zwane to become chairperson of the transport committee.

References

External links
Mr Lawrence Edward Mc Donald at Parliament of South Africa

Living people
1966 births
Members of the National Assembly of South Africa
21st-century South African politicians
African National Congress politicians
People from the Free State (province)
South African people of Scottish descent
White South African people